Afterimage is a crime novel by the American writer Kathleen George set in contemporary Pittsburgh, Pennsylvania.

It tells the story of two murders, one of a woman and one of a child, that seem to be unrelated. Richard Christie, Head of Homicide, takes on the case, as in George's two previous novels in the series, but in this book a rookie female detective, Colleen Greer, is introduced as a key player.

Sources
Contemporary Authors Online. The Gale Group, 2006. PEN (Permanent Entry Number): 0000142340.

External links
 Kathleen George website

2007 American novels
American crime novels

Novels set in Pittsburgh